Chácobo-Pakawara is a  Panoan language spoken by about 550 of 860 ethnic tribal Chácobo people of the Beni Department northwest of Magdalena, Bolivia, and (as of 2004) 17 of 50 Pakawara.  Chácobo children are learning the language as a first language, but Pakawara is moribund.
Karipuna may have been a variant; alternative names are Jaunavô (Jau-Navo) and Éloe.

Several sleeping and unattested languages were reported to have been related, perhaps dialects.  These include Capuibo and Sinabo/Shinabo of the Mamoré River.  However, nothing is actually known of these purported languages.

Examples

Numerals

Pronouns

Vocabulary

References

External links
 Lenguas de Bolivia (online edition)
 New Testament in Chácobo
 Chácobo (Intercontinental Dictionary Series)
 Pacahuara (Intercontinental Dictionary Series)

Indigenous languages of the Andes
Panoan languages
Mamoré–Guaporé linguistic area